Jelena Tripolski (יילנה טריפולסקי; also "Yelena"; born November 18, 1967) is an Israeli former Olympic sport shooter. She is Jewish, immigrated to Israel, and is an electronic engineer.

Shooting career
Tripolski competed for Israel at the 1992 Summer Olympics in Barcelona, at the age of 24, in Shooting--Women's Sporting Pistol, 25 metres, and came in tied for 21st with a score of 573.  She also competed in Shooting--Women's Air Pistol, 10 metres, and came in tied for 37th with a score of 372.

References

External links
 

1967 births
Living people
Israeli female sport shooters
Shooters at the 1992 Summer Olympics
Olympic shooters of Israel
Jewish sport shooters
Israeli Jews